The men's 20 kilometres race walk at the 1969 European Athletics Championships was held in Athens, Greece, on 16 September 1969.

Medalists

Results

Final
16 September

Participation
According to an unofficial count, 21 athletes from 11 countries participated in the event.

 (1)
 (2)
 (1)
 (3)
 (1)
 (2)
 (1)
 (3)
 (3)
 (1)
 (3)

References

20 kilometres race walk
Racewalking at the European Athletics Championships